Prophets is the debut studio album by Canadian melodic hardcore band Counterparts. It was released February 23, 2010 through Verona Records.

Track listing
All lyrics written by Brendan Murphy

Personnel
'''Counterparts
 Brendan Murphy – lead vocals
 Jesse Doreen – guitar
 Alex Re – guitar, backing vocals, clean vocals
 Eric Bazinet – bass
 Ryan Juntilla – drums, percussion

References

2010 debut albums
Counterparts (band) albums